Roma Sub Rosa is a series of historical mystery novels by Steven Saylor set in ancient Rome and therefore populated by famous historic roman citizens. The phrase "Roma Sub Rosa" means, in Latin, "Rome under the rose." If a matter was sub rosa, "under the rose," it meant that such matter was confidential.

The detective is known as Gordianus the Finder, and he mixes with non-fictional citizens of the Republic including Sulla, Cicero, Marcus Crassus, Catilina, Catullus , Pompey, Julius Caesar, and Mark Antony.

Characters
For an ancient Roman, Gordianus has an unconventional family: 
 Bethesda, his beautiful Egyptian slave purchased from a slave market in Alexandria. Bethesda and Gordianus have a mutually affectionate relationship and are later married after he frees her. 
 Eco, his oldest adopted son, was a mute boy when he first appeared as a key player in the book Roman Blood. He recovered his speech in Arms of Nemesis.  He followed in his father's (meaning Gordianus) footsteps as an investigator.  
 Meto, his second adopted son, was a slave of Crassus who became a soldier serving under Julius Caesar.
 Rupa, his third adopted son, brother to Cassandra; a mute.
 Diana, his intellectual and headstrong daughter (by Bethesda).
 Davus, his son-in-law (Diana's husband) who was Gordianus' former slave and bodyguard.
 Aulus, his grandson (by Diana).
 Little Bethesda, his granddaughter (by Diana).

Titles
The books are listed below in chronological order. For publication order, see the author's page.

The Seven Wonders (2012) — 92-90 BC: The young Gordianus travels to see the Wonders of the Ancient World. 
Raiders of the Nile (2014) — 88 BC: The young Gordianus must travel into the Nile Delta to find a gang of bandits.
Wrath of the Furies (2015) — 88 BC: Gordianus travels to Ephesus during Mithridates' war against Rome
Roman Blood (1991) — 80 BC: Gordianus investigates a murder case for the famous lawyer Cicero.
The House of the Vestals (1997) — 80-72 BC : Short stories. 
A Gladiator Dies Only Once (2005) — 77-64 BC: Short stories.
Arms of Nemesis (1992) — 72 BC : Gordianus tries to save the lives of 99 slaves, while Spartacus threatens Rome.
Catilina's Riddle (1993) — 63 BC: Gordianus is embroiled in the Catiline conspiracy.
The Venus Throw (1995) — 56 BC: Gordianus tries to discover who murdered an Egyptian diplomat.
A Murder on the Appian Way (1996) — 52 BC: Gordianus investigates the death of Publius Clodius Pulcher.
Rubicon (1999) — 49 BC: Gordianus investigates a murder close to home as Rome nears civil war. 
Last Seen in Massilia (2000) — 49 BC: Gordianus looks for his son Meto in the city of Massilia as it is besieged by the army of Caesar.
A Mist of Prophecies (2002) — 48 BC: Gordianus searches for the killer of a seeress.
The Judgment of Caesar (2004) — 48 BC: Gordianus travels to Egypt in an attempt to find a cure for his wife's illness.
The Triumph of Caesar (2008) — 46 BC: Gordianus investigates a conspiracy to murder Caesar.
The Throne of Caesar (2018) - 44 BC: the Ides of March and the conclusion of the series.

- "Ill Seen in Tyre" (2014), in the cross-genre anthology Rogues, edited by George R. R. Martin and Gardner Dozois, set in 91 BC just before the Epilogue of The Seven Wonders

References

External links
Roma Sub Rosa web page
Roma Sub Rosa novels at The Detective and the Toga

 
Novel series
Novels about slavery in ancient Rome
Fictional historical detectives
Minotaur Books books